Liston (Lin) D. Bochette III, born June 16, 1957, is an athlete, artist and civic leader. He participated in several Olympic Games as an athlete and administrator.

Education

Bochette studied at Florida State University, the University of Puerto Rico, and was accepted at Stanford University. He collected a Bachelor's BFA degree in Fine Arts from the University of Florida; a Master's degree MA in Humanities from Inter American University; studied an ED at Inter American University and completed a PhD in Education from Pacific Western University. American University awarded him an Honorary Doctorate in Humanity in 2022. He has taught at Inter American University in the field of communication and continues in education as a visiting professor at Tiffin University’s College of Sports Management and on the distance faculty for the United States Sports Academy. In 1983 he was awarded a Citation of Merit by the Senate of Puerto Rico and in 2022 appointed as a United Nations Ambassador for Peace.

Sports

Bochette was a Junior All American, attended the University of Florida on a Track and Field Scholarship offered to him by Olympic Coach Jimmy Carnes and was later inducted into the University's Hall of Fame. He competed internationally in the decathlon for the Puerto Rico Track and Field Team and won a gold at the 1982 Central American and Caribbean Games  He cofounded the Fort Myers Track Club in his youth in 1970s. Beginning in the 1980s, he worked closely with many International Olympic Committee Members, in developing programs and projects for the Olympic Family. He participated, in various capacities, in the Summer and Winter Olympic Games—as an advocate for the Olympic Movement; a qualified athlete Track and Field in 1984, as an official in 1988; and as an accredited bobsleigh athlete for Puerto Rico in 1992, 1994, 1998 and 2002.  In 2002-2006, he served on the International Olympic Committee’s elite Athletes Commission in Switzerland. In 1999 he was unanimously elected as Secretary General of the World Olympian Association and served two consecutive terms. International Olympic Committee.  In this position he led a highly successful global campaign to unite alumni athletes under the Olympic banner in order to promote Olympic values in their countries. He founded the Pan American Olympians Association in 2006 to improve fellowship among the Olympians in the hemisphere and the International Cultural Consortium in 1996 for enhancing the union between sport and cultural as an educational instrument.  He was named as one of the greatest Athletes of the century in Southwest Florida by the Gannett News Press.

Bochette is the founding President of the Puerto Rico National Olympians Association and assisted over one hundred countries develop their Olympians Associations. World Olympians Association He founded the Puerto Rico national federations for Badminton, Canoe and Kayak. Bochette has been an executive officer of the University of Florida Track and Field Alumni Association (UFTFAA). Bochette also serves on the UIPM Pierre De Coubertin Committee for the promotion of Olympism and its core values.

Art

Bochette is best known for his drawings and paintings but also works in sculpture, stained glass, film, dance, and literature. In 1996 he was named the International Sports Artist of the Year by the United States Sports Academy and later served on the institutions Board. He was responsible for designing branding logos at the University of Florida and served as the Director of the Olympic sports museum in Puerto Rico and was the co-founder along with four-time Olympic Gold medalist Al Oerter as the Director for the Art of the Olympians. Bochette is a consulting partner for Arnold Entertainment and film productions. He has been a key note speaker at the International Children's Art Olympiad held in Washington DC. He holds workshops for the creative development of creativity in children and adults around the world. He has exhibited in Osaka, Monte Carlo, Athens, New York, and other major cultural capitals. His art is in a number of private collections world wide.

Public Service

Bochette, with colleagues, set up the Al Oerter Center for Excellence and serves on the Board of the Uncommon Friends Foundation (Thomas Edison and Henry Ford et. al). He has Chaired the Olympian Foundation since its inception. Bochette has worked in on camera broadcast with major networks including Telemundo. He has addressed meetings at the United Nations and served as an appointed and an elected official in government with distinction as Councilman and Mayor Pro Tem for the City of Fort Myers, Florida.

References

Living people
1957 births
Puerto Rican decathletes
Competitors at the 1982 Central American and Caribbean Games
Puerto Rican male bobsledders
Olympic bobsledders of Puerto Rico
Bobsledders at the 1992 Winter Olympics
Bobsledders at the 1994 Winter Olympics
Bobsledders at the 1998 Winter Olympics
University of Florida College of Liberal Arts and Sciences alumni
Florida State University alumni
University of Puerto Rico alumni
Sportspeople from Fort Myers, Florida
Track and field athletes from Florida
Central American and Caribbean Games gold medalists for Puerto Rico
Central American and Caribbean Games medalists in athletics